Luis Alberto González (born June 26, 1979) is a former infielder in Major League Baseball.

Career
González made his debut in the 2004 season. On April 6, facing Randy Johnson and the Arizona Diamondbacks in the season opener for both teams, González went 2-for-5, including one home run and two RBI, and the Rockies topped Arizona, 5–2.

González became the fifth Venezuelan player to play in the JCL during the  season, joining fellow countrymen  Alex Cabrera, Darwin Cubillán, Geremi González and Alex Ramírez.

On May 26, 2008, it was reported that González had violated the anti-doping policy in Nippon Professional Baseball, resulting in a one-year ban. The Yomiuri Giants released him after the incident.

On December 31, 2008, González signed a minor-league deal with the Colorado Rockies.

See also
 List of Major League Baseball players from Venezuela

References

External links

Japanese Baseball
RotoWorld

1979 births
Living people
Akron Aeros players
Baseball players suspended for drug offenses
Buffalo Bisons (minor league) players
Caribes de Anzoátegui players
Caribes de Oriente players
Colorado Rockies players
Colorado Springs Sky Sox players
Columbus Red Stixx players
Kinston Indians players
Major League Baseball outfielders
Major League Baseball players from Venezuela
Major League Baseball second basemen
Nippon Professional Baseball first basemen
Nippon Professional Baseball second basemen
Sportspeople from Maracay
Tiburones de La Guaira players
Venezuelan expatriate baseball players in Japan
Venezuelan expatriate baseball players in the United States
Venezuelan sportspeople in doping cases
Yomiuri Giants players